Also see: Appleton, Oshkosh, Fond du Lac, and Neenah
The Fox Valley is a large metropolitan area in northern Wisconsin on Lake Winnebago. The head city in this metro area is Appleton. The population of the metro area is about 467,586. The largest cities in the Fox Valley metro are Appleton, Oshkosh, and Fond Du Lac. However, three separate metropolitan areas make up the larger Fox Valley Metro area. These metro areas are: Appleton metro, Oshkosh metro, and the Fond Du Lac metro.

The following list has the tallest buildings in the Fox Valley. Every city mentioned before has at least one building on this list, Neenah also has one building in this list. The buildings on this list are all over 100 feet tall. Appleton has the most buildings on this list. The list includes the rank of the building, name of the building, city the building is in, height of the building in feet and in meters, how many floors the building has, and notes about the building.

List

References 

Emporis.com
Emporis.com
Emporis.com
Emporis.com

Tallest
Appleton, Wisconsin
Fond du Lac, Wisconsin
Oshkosh, Wisconsin